Tiwagorn Withiton (born 31 October 1975) is a Thai political and human rights activist, farmer and engineer. He is one of the first political activists in Thailand that openly challenge the country's taboo, harsh punishment by the Monarchy defamation law, by publishing his photo of him wearing a printed 'I lost faith in the Monarchy' T-shirt. 

He has encouraged people to wear it because it stated a sentiment, not defamation. It went viral on social media, but later, Internal Security Operations Command took him to Psychiatric Hospital. It is one of the causes to start the 2020–2021 Thai protests' second wave protests, the largest demonstration since the 2014 Thai coup d'état, demanding him out of forcibly hospitalized. His movement is regarded as one of the biggest turning points of Thailand political landscape, earned him the person of the year 2020 by Prachatai.

Early life

Tiwagorn was born in the village of Don Chang in Mueang Khon Kaen District of Khon Kaen Province, northeastern Thailand. In 1993, he attended an electrical engineering program in communication engineering and computer at King Mongkut's University of Technology North Bangkok, and graduated in 1998 to become an engineer in an IT company in Bangkok.

2006 coup and 2014 coup

In 2007, he realized the 2006 Thai coup d'état did not make the country better. He came out to be one of the protesters in the Saturday Anti-Dictator Group movement by Suchart Nakbangsai. A political resistance was beginning in which he was involved in an online group talk 'Ratchadamnoen Camfrog' group, evolved from 'Pantip Ratchadamnoen' discussion web board.

He was in the 2010 Thai political protests and remained in the 2010 Thai military crackdown, after that he continued going out to protest with the Red Sunday Group by Sombat Boongam-anong. He created an online group talk 'RedTalk' (later 'FreedomTalk') for Red Shirts people.

At the end of 2010, he announced to leave the Red Shirts group to his friends, one of his was a well-known activist, Kritsuda Khunasen. He quit a job, did a charity by building takraw court under Rama 7 bridge. He left Bangkok to Khon Kean after the 2014 Thai coup d'état and discontinued his activism by focusing on farming in his home.

T-Shirt protest

Viral

On 16 June 2020, he posted a photo in his Facebook account that went viral online. Before that, he proposed the idea of using the slogan 'I lost faith in the Monarchy' in 'The Royalists Marketplace', the monarchy-satire Facebook group by Pavin Chachavalpongpun. Many users were concerned for lese majeste law which had been used broadly and unpredictably. His photo received more than 4,000 comments from both sides of political viewpoints. He re-entered activism again because Wanchalearm, a Thai political activist, was abducted by armed men in Phnom Penh on 4 June 2020.

On 19 June and 4 July, Internal Security Operations Command officer and a local police officer came to his house to discuss with him. 

On 5 July 2020, he showed the contract which signed him off of his family in his Facebook account for safety issues.

Political abuse of psychiatry

On 9 July 2020, 10 police and hospital vehicles came to his house in the early night, a group of police officers and nurses went into his house. He was forcedly carried out by a group of 6 officers and taken to hospital. In a car, the officers tied his hands with a cloth and inject him with unknown medication. The police searched his house and took his computer and smartphone, and made his mother sign a consent of bringing him to be admitted to Rajanagarindra Psychiatric Hospital in Khon Kaen. Hospital director, Nattakorn Champathong, explained that Tiwagorn had not been forced to enter the hospital. Khon Kaen’s police chief, Major General Puttipong Musikul explained that he was getting treatment because his relatives had him admitted.

Subsequent to protests by civil rights groups and media stories, Tiwagorn was released by Rajanagarindra Psychiatric Hospital, on 22 July 2020.

See also
2020–2021 Thai protests
 List of peace activists
 Lèse-majesté in Thailand
 Jatupat Boonpattararaksa

References

Withiton Tiwagorn
Withiton Tiwagorn
Withiton Tiwagorn
People accused of lèse majesté in Thailand
People accused of lèse majesté in Thailand since 2020
People from Khon Kaen province
Thai activists
Thai human rights activists
Thai democracy activists
Thai monarchy reform activists
Thai revolutionaries